Hypersonic Flight Experiment or HEX was the first test flight in the RLV Technology Demonstration Programme of the Indian Space Research Organisation (ISRO). The demonstration trials will pave the way for a two-stage-to-orbit (TSTO) fully re-usable launch vehicle. HEX was launched on 23 May 2016.

Configuration

 First stage: live, 9 ton solid booster (S-9)
 Second stage: winged test vehicle, no main engines (scramjet will be used in the future)
In 2009, an airframe engineering model, axisymmetric proto nose cap after graphitisation (C-C) and slow burn rate propellant were completed. Aerodynamic characterization of technology demonstration vehicle was completed at National Aerospace Laboratories (NAL), Vikram Sarabhai Space Centre (VSSC) and Indian Institute of Space Science and Technology (IIST). Computational flow simulation and supersonic combustion in ground testing were also completed.

RLV-TD consists of a fuselage (body), a nose cap, double delta wings and twin vertical rudders. It has active control surfaces called Elevons and Rudders. Apart from the twin rudders it is similar in shape and operation to a small Space Shuttle Orbiter.

Thermal Protection System

TDV uses 600 or so heat resistant silica tiles and Flexible External Insulation, nose-cap is made out Carbon-Carbon composite with SiC coating. The leading edges of twin rudders are Inconel-718, wing leading edges of 15CDV6.

Objectives
HEX was the first test flight of a reusable launch vehicle developed by India. The test flight objectives included:
 Validating the aerodynamic design characteristics during hypersonic flight
 Characterize induced loads during the hypersonic descent through the atmosphere
 Assess the performance of the carbon fibre used in construction of the nose of the vehicle
 Demonstrate first stage separation sequencing

Launch and flight

The Hypersonic Flight Experiment, or HEX, was the first test-flight in the RLV Technology Demonstration Programme.  The RLV-TD vehicle was launched from the first launchpad of Satish Dhawan Space Centre on 23 May 2016 at 7:00 AM local time, on board an HS9 rocket booster.
 
After a successful lift that lasted 91.1 seconds to a height of about 56 km, the RLV-TD separated from the 9-ton HS9 booster and further ascended to a height of about 65 km. The RLV-TD then began its descent at about Mach 5 (five times the speed of sound). The vehicle's navigation, guidance and control systems accurately steered the vehicle during this phase for a controlled splashdown down to the defined landing spot over the Bay of Bengal, at a distance of about 450 km from Sriharikota, thereby fulfilling its mission objectives.

The vehicle was tracked during its flight from ground stations at Sriharikota and a shipborne terminal. The total flight duration from launch to splashdown lasted about 773.6 seconds. The unit was not planned to be recovered.  ISRO plans to construct an airstrip greater than 4 km long in Sriharikota island in the "near future".  Critical technologies such as autonomous navigation, guidance & control, reusable thermal protection system, and descent mission management were validated in this flight.

See also

 Reusable launch system

References

Space programme of India